Crazy Like a Fox: The Definitive Chronicle of Brian Pillman 20 Years Later is a 2017 biography about American football player and professional wrestler Brian Pillman written by Liam O'Rourke and published by CreateSpace Independent Publishing Platform. It won the Wrestling Observer Newsletter award for Best Pro Wrestling Book.

References

External links
 http://sirboring.com/2018/06/04/crazy-like-a-fox-the-definitive-chronicle-of-brian-pillman-20-years-later-by-liam-orourke/

2017 non-fiction books
Professional wrestling biographies
Brian Pillman
CreateSpace books